Ivanko is a Slavic given name and a surname, a diminutive from the given name Ivan, a Slavic variant of the name "John". It may be a transliteration from Иванко or Иванько.

Notable people with the name include:

Given name 
 Ivanko (Bulgarian boyar), killed Tsar Ivan Asen I, entered Byzantine service, rebelled and was captured
 Ivanko (despot), ruler of the Despotate of Dobruja from 1385 to 1389, and again from 1393 to 1399
Ivanko Farolfi (1892–1945),  lawyer and Croatian and Yugoslavian politician

Surname 
Sophia Ivanko, a contestant from Ukraine in the Junior Eurovision Song Contest 2019
Vitaliy Ivanko (born 1992), Ukrainian footballer

Fictional characters
 Ivanko, from "Ivanko, the Bear's Son", English translation of a Russian adaptation of the French tale Jean de l'Ours

Other
 Ivanko (album), 2020 album by Anna Lesko; see Anna Lesko discography
 "Ivanko, the Killer of Asen I" (aka Ivanko), 1872 play by Kliment of Tarnovo
, Russian comedy TV series

See also

 Alternate forms for the name John
 Ivanković
 Ivanka (disambiguation)
 Ivan (disambiguation)